Salting or Salted may refer to:

People
George Salting (1835–1909), Australian-born English art collector, who left the Salting Bequest, which included the
Salting Madonna (Antonello da Messina), National Gallery, London

Other
 Salting (food), the preparation of food with edible salt for conservation or taste
 Salting the earth, the practice of "sowing" salt on cities or property as a symbolic act
 Salting a bird's tail, a superstition
 Salt marsh
 Salting out, a method of separating proteins using salt
 Salting (initiation ceremony), an early modern English university initiation ceremony
 Salting roads, the application of salt to roads in winter to act as a de-icing agent
 Figuratively, adding ("sprinkling") a small quantity of something to something else for various reasons
 Salt (cryptography), a method to secure passwords
 Salted bomb, a nuclear weapon specifically engineered to enhance residual radioactivity
 Salting (confidence trick), process of adding valuable substances to a core sample, or otherwise scattering valuable resources on a piece of property to be "discovered" by a prospective buyer
 Salt, allowing a horse to catch the nagana disease, so that after recovery the horse can be used in infected areas
 Salting mailing lists, including fictitious entries in mailing lists to detect misuse
 Salt (union organizing), a labor union tactic involving the act of getting a job at a specific workplace with the intent of organizing a union
 Salted (book), a 2010 cookbook by Mark Bitterman

See also
 Salt (disambiguation)
 Salty (disambiguation)